Wright Patman Dam (formerly called Texarkana Dam) is an earth-fill dam across the Sulphur River in northeast Texas in the United States. The water impounded by the dam forms Wright Patman Lake.

Geography

The dam straddles the border between Bowie County and Cass County.

History

Wright Patman Dam, then known as Texarkana Dam, was authorized as part of the Flood Contract Act of 1946. Construction began in 1948, and the Sulphur River was blocked and routed through the dam's control gates in 1953. The gates were closed and water impounded in 1956. In 1973, the project was renamed in honor of Congressman Wright Patman of Texas.

The dam's design and construction were the responsibility of the New Orleans District of the U.S. Army Corps of Engineers. In 1973, responsibility for the dam and lake were transferred to the Fort Worth District of the Corps of Engineers.

External links 
 Wright Patman Lake information from the U.S. Army Corps of Engineers
 Location

Buildings and structures in Bowie County, Texas
Buildings and structures in Cass County, Texas
Dams in Texas
Earth-filled dams
United States Army Corps of Engineers dams
Dams completed in 1956